Claire Edun, popularly known as Oyinbo Princess, is a British-born Nollywood actress best known for her fluency in Nigerian Pidgin; which eventually landed her a lead role in the film (ATM) Authentic Tentative Marriage, a 2016 feature film directed by Lancelot Imasuen.

Life and career
Edun was born to British parents and had her education in the United Kingdom. Upon leaving Greece where she previously worked, she got a job as an air hostess for British Airways which eventually ignited her love for Africa and Nigeria in particular. She rose to the limelight in 2015 after she posted a video of herself on Facebook talking in fluent pidgin English which Lancelot Imasuen later saw and afterwards handed her a role in the film (ATM) Authentic Tentative Marriage, where she played the role of a British girl who came to Nigeria to marry a Nigerian man who wants to live in Britain.

Filmography
(ATM) Authentic Tentative Marriage (2016)

References

1985 births
Living people
Actors from Winchester
British actresses
British women comedians
British expatriate actresses in Nigeria
21st-century British actresses